Ernest Charles Barber (April 18, 1914 – June 5, 1989) was an American football center in the National Football League for the Washington Redskins.  He played college football at the University of San Francisco.

References

1914 births
American football offensive linemen
San Francisco Dons football players
Washington Redskins players
People from Manteca, California
Players of American football from California
1989 deaths